Mount Stewart is on the Great Western Divide, a sub-range of the Sierra Nevada in  California. The High Sierra Trail traverses Kaweah Gap south of the summit, and Lilliput Glacier is on the mountain's northern flank.

The mountain is named for George W. Stewart, editor of Visalia Delta. Stewart was the leader of a campaign to protect the "Big Trees". Francis P. Farquhar, author and former president of the Sierra Club, credits Stewart as "the father" of Sequoia National Park.

Climate
According to the Köppen climate classification system, Mount Stewart is located in an alpine climate zone. Most weather fronts originate in the Pacific Ocean, and travel east toward the Sierra Nevada mountains. As fronts approach, they are forced upward by the peaks (orographic lift), causing them to drop their moisture in the form of rain or snowfall onto the range.

References 

Mountains of Sequoia National Park
Mountains of Tulare County, California
North American 3000 m summits
Mountains of Northern California
Sierra Nevada (United States)